Fat Albert (1973) is the 15th comedy album by Bill Cosby.

After six years of recalling memories of his childhood friend "Fat Albert" Robertson in his stand-up routines, this would be the final album in which Fat Albert is mentioned.

Two tracks on the album were previously released (and edited differently) on When I Was a Kid: "Fat Albert Got a Hernia" (as "My Hernia") and "My Brother, Russell."

Unlike some of his other albums, the album had more kid-friendly humor on it.

Track listing
All tracks by Bill Cosby

"Fat Albert's Car" – 8:15
"Fat Albert Plays Dead" – 2:07
"Fat Albert Got A Hernia" – 3:54
"My Wife and Kids" – 4:11
"My Dad's Car" – 5:50
"My Brother, Russell" – 2:30
"Fernet Branca" – 9:37

Personnel 

Bill Cosby – vocals
Lowell Frank – producer, engineer
Mark Omann – mastering

Reception
Allmusic  [ link] 

1973 albums
Bill Cosby live albums
Stand-up comedy albums
Spoken word albums by American artists
Live spoken word albums
MCA Records live albums
1970s comedy albums